Amir Khan Yaghlevandli-Javanshir (b. Yaghlevandli oymagh, Safavid Karabakh - d. Kashmir, Durrani Empire ) was a Qizilbash military and political figure, general, belonging to the same family as the Karabakh khans.

Life 
Amir Khan was born around 1732 in a Javanshir clan in Yaghlevandli oymagh of Karabagh. His father, Safi Khan, came from the Yaghlevandli or Yaghlavend oymagh of the Turkic Javanshir clan of Afshar tribe. In 1756, he was taken into the service of the Afghan Ahmad Shah Durrani. He made several campaigns with the Shah in Kashmir in 1756, Sirhind and Sind in 1757, Balochistan in 1750, Sistan in 1754, Khorasan in 1754 and Balkh in 1752. In 1770, Amir Khan Jevanshir was appointed governor of Kashmir by order of Ahmad Shah Dürrani. Amir Khan Jevanshir built a number of attractions in Kashmir, for example, Sher Garni palace and Amiran Kadal bridge. Persecuted Kashmiri Pandits. According to Ser Walter Roper Lawrence  was possibly the best of the Afghan rulers:

Amir Khan Jevanshir died in 1775 in Kashmir.

See also 
 Javanshir clan
Javanshir Qizilbash
Qizilbashi

References

Source 
 
 
 
1732 births
1775 deaths
Karabakh Khanate
18th century in Azerbaijan
People from Afsharid Iran
Ethnic Afshar people